James Thomas Hieronymus (born July 29, 1976) is an American actor, stuntman and former mixed martial artist.  Hieron was the final IFL Welterweight Champion, competing for the Los Angeles Anacondas, and has also competed in the UFC, WEC, Affliction, Strikeforce, and Bellator.

Early life
Hieron went to live with John and Theo Hieronymous when he was a newborn due to the fact that his mother had trouble raising him. He was officially adopted by the couple when he was eight years old.

Hieron, a two-time state wrestling championship runner-up at Freeport (N.Y.) High School and national Junior College Champion at Nassau (N.Y.) Community College, where he earned an associate degree, Hieron later attended Hofstra University. Before his senior year at Hofstra University, he tested positive for marijuana, and was unable to wrestle his senior year.

Mixed martial arts
After being kicked off the wrestling team at Hofstra University, Hieron began dealing drugs before being charged with a felony. He turned to boxing to let his aggressions out on the bags. Finding this to be a good stress-reliever, and with the encouragement of some friends who trained in MMA, Hieron combined his wrestling skills and burgeoning boxing prowess into a professional MMA career.

Early career
In March 2006, Hieron won the Lockdown in Paradise in Lahaina, Hawaii, and in June 2006 won his IFL debut at the IFL Team Championships in Atlantic City, New Jersey.

Following the demise of the International Fight League due to financial concerns, Hieron signed with Affliction in August 2008. However, that promotion soon folded as well, so Hieron signed with Strikeforce.

Strikeforce
Hieron's first Strikeforce fight was set to be against fellow former Zuffa competitor Nick Diaz at Strikeforce: Carano vs. Cyborg for the inaugural Strikeforce welterweight title. However, Diaz missed a pre-fight drug test mandated by the California State Athletic Commission and was denied a license to compete. Jesse Taylor was named to replace Diaz and the fight was changed to a non-title bout. Hieron won by unanimous decision. He had his heart set on a title shot against Nick Diaz, but has stated that he would be comfortable fighting any top level opponent, as long as the fight, and name is helping him move forward in his career.

Hieron faced Joe Riggs on January 30, 2010 at Strikeforce: Miami. Hieron won the fight via unanimous decision. After the fight had finished, Hieron's contract with Strikeforce was completed, prompting Hieron to immediately call for demands should he sign a new one. The demands included a shot at champion Nick Diaz and guaranteed television spots.

Bellator Fighting Championships
Hieron and Explosion Entertainment were unable to come to terms, so Hieron instead ended up signing to fight on Bellator Fighting Championships in the promotion's Season 4 welterweight tournament. In the opening quarterfinal round  Hieron won via controversial stoppage when referee Josh Rosenthal stopped the bout when Lapsley did not respond to a hand check. Lapsley contested he wasn't out and this appeared to be the case, but given the position, it is unlikely that he would have survived the round. Hieron stated in a post-fight interview that Lapsley was gurgling and he felt him going out. Hieron won a controversial unanimous decision victory over Brent Weedman at Bellator 40 to move on to the tournament finals. At Bellator 43 Hieron defeated Rick Hawn via split decision to win the Season 4 Welterweight Tournament. With this victory Hieron earned a title shot against Bellator Welterweight Champion Ben Askren. Askren defeated Hieron via controversial split decision.

Ultimate Fighting Championship
Hieron was expected to face Jake Ellenberger in a rematch on September 1, 2012 at UFC 151, replacing an injured Josh Koscheck.  However, after the UFC 151 event was cancelled, Ellenberger/Hieron took place on October 5, 2012 at UFC on FX 5. Hieron lost via unanimous decision.

Hieron was expected to face Erick Silva on February 2, 2013 at UFC 156. However, Silva pulled out of the bout citing an injury and was replaced by promotional newcomer Tyron Woodley. He lost the fight KO (punches) in round 1 and was subsequently released from the promotion.

On March 7, 2014, Hieron announced his retirement from MMA competition.

Championships and accomplishments

Mixed martial arts
Bellator Fighting Championships
Bellator Season 4 Welterweight Tournament Winner
International Fight League
IFL Welterweight Championship (One time; First; Last)
IFL 2007 Welterweight Grand Prix Champion

Amateur wrestling
National Junior College Athletic Association
NJCAA Junior Collegiate Championship (1997)
NJCAA All-American (1996, 1997)
New York State Public High School Athletic Association
NYSPHSAA Division I High School State Championship Runner-up (1992, 1994)

Mixed martial arts record

|-
| Loss 
| align=center| 23–7
| Tyron Woodley
| KO (punches)
| UFC 156
| 
| align=center| 1 
| align=center| 0:36
| Las Vegas, Nevada, United States
| 
|-
| Loss
| align=center| 23–6
| Jake Ellenberger
| Decision (unanimous)
| UFC on FX: Browne vs. Bigfoot
| 
| align=center| 3 
| align=center| 5:00
| Minneapolis, Minnesota, United States
| 
|-
| Win
| align=center| 23–5
| Romario da Silva
| Technical Submission (d'arce choke)
| Legacy Fighting Championship 12
| 
| align=center| 2
| align=center| 2:04
| Houston, Texas, United States
| 
|-
| Loss
| align=center| 22–5
| Ben Askren
| Decision (split)
| Bellator 56
| 
| align=center| 5
| align=center| 5:00
| Kansas City, Missouri, United States
| 
|-
| Win
| align=center| 22–4
| Rick Hawn
| Decision (split)
| Bellator 43
| 
| align=center| 3
| align=center| 5:00
| Newkirk, Oklahoma, United States
| 
|-
| Win
| align=center| 21–4
| Brent Weedman
| Decision (unanimous)
| Bellator 40
| 
| align=center| 3
| align=center| 5:00
| Newkirk, Oklahoma, United States
| 
|-
| Win
| align=center| 20–4
| Anthony Lapsley
| Technical Submission (rear-naked choke)
| Bellator 35
| 
| align=center| 1
| align=center| 3:39
| Lemoore, California, United States
| 
|-
| Win
| align=center| 19–4
| Joe Riggs
| Decision (unanimous)
| Strikeforce: Miami
| 
| align=center| 3
| align=center| 5:00
| Sunrise, Florida, United States
| 
|-
| Win
| align=center| 18–4
| Jesse Taylor
| Decision (unanimous)
| Strikeforce: Carano vs. Cyborg
| 
| align=center| 3
| align=center| 5:00
| San Jose, California, United States
| 
|-
| Win
| align=center| 17–4
| Jason High
| KO (punch)
| Affliction: Day of Reckoning
| 
| align=center| 1
| align=center| 1:04
| Anaheim, California, United States
| 
|-
| Win
| align=center| 16–4
| Chris Kennedy
| Decision (unanimous)
| SuperFights MMA: Night of Combat 2
| 
| align=center| 3
| align=center| 5:00
| Las Vegas, Nevada, United States
| 
|-
| Win
| align=center| 15–4
| Mark Miller
| TKO (punches)
| IFL: New Jersey
| 
| align=center| 1
| align=center| 2:10
| East Rutherford, New Jersey, United States
| 
|-
| Win
| align=center| 14–4
| Delson Heleno
| TKO (leg injury)
| IFL World Grand Prix Finals
| 
| align=center| 1
| align=center| 4:00
| Uncasville, Connecticut, United States
| 
|-
| Win
| align=center| 13–4
| Donnie Liles
| Decision (unanimous)
| IFL: World Grand Prix Semifinals
| 
| align=center| 3
| align=center| 4:00
| Chicago, Illinois, United States
| 
|-
| Loss
| align=center| 12–4
| Brad Blackburn
| KO (punches)
| IFL: Everett
| 
| align=center| 1
| align=center| 0:40
| Everett, Washington, United States
| 
|-
| Win
| align=center| 12–3
| Donnie Liles
| Submission (guillotine choke)
| IFL: Los Angeles
| 
| align=center| 1
| align=center| 2:49
| Los Angeles, California, United States
| 
|-
| Win
| align=center| 11–3
| Victor Moreno
| Submission (rear-naked choke)
| IFL: Houston
| 
| align=center| 1
| align=center| 1:55
| Houston, Texas, United States
| 
|-
| Loss
| align=center| 10–3
| Chris Wilson
| Decision (unanimous)
| IFL: World Championship Semifinals
| 
| align=center| 3
| align=center| 4:00
| Portland, Oregon, United States
| 
|-
| Win
| align=center| 10–2
| Amos Sotelo
| Submission (guillotine choke)
| IFL: Portland
| 
| align=center| 1
| align=center| 0:26
| Portland, Oregon, United States
| 
|-
| Win
| align=center| 9–2
| Jake Ellenberger
| Decision (unanimous)
| IFL: Championship 2006
| 
| align=center| 3
| align=center| 4:00
| Atlantic City, New Jersey, United States
| 
|-
| Win
| align=center| 8–2
| Steve Schneider
| TKO (punches)
| Titan FC 1
| 
| align=center| 1
| align=center| 0:55
| Kansas City, Kansas, United States
| 
|-
| Loss
| align=center| 7–2
| Jonathan Goulet
| TKO (doctor stoppage)
| UFC Fight Night 2
| 
| align=center| 3
| align=center| 1:05
| Las Vegas, Nevada, United States
| 
|-
| Win
| align=center| 7–1
| Pat Healy
| Decision (unanimous)
| IFC: Rock N' Rumble
| 
| align=center| 3
| align=center| 5:00
| Reno, Nevada, United States
| 
|-
| Win
| align=center| 6–1
| Richard Brass
| Decision (unanimous)
|  WEC 15: Judgment Day
| 
| align=center| 3
| align=center| 5:00
| Lemoore, California, United States
| 
|-
| Win
| align=center| 5–1
| Ronald Jhun
| TKO (doctor stoppage)
| Lockdown in Paradise 1
| 
| align=center| 1
| align=center| 4:34
| Hawaii, United States
| 
|-
| Loss
| align=center| 4–1
| Georges St-Pierre
| TKO (punches)
| UFC 48
| 
| align=center| 1
| align=center| 1:42
| Las Vegas, Nevada, United States
| 
|-
| Win
| align=center| 4–0
| Fabio Holanda
| Decision (unanimous)
| MMA: Eruption
| 
| align=center| 3
| align=center| 5:00
| Lowell, Massachusetts, United States
| 
|-
| Win
| align=center| 3–0
| Fernando Munoz
| TKO (submission to punches)
| Ring of Combat 6
| 
| align=center| 1
| align=center| 0:33
| Elizabeth, New Jersey, United States
| 
|-
| Win
| align=center| 2–0
| Jermaine Johnson
| Submission (rear-naked choke)
| Ring of Combat 5
| 
| align=center| 1
| align=center| 1:02
| Elizabeth, New Jersey, United States
| 
|-
| Win
| align=center| 1–0
| Keith Plate
| TKO (punches)
| Reality Fighting 4
| 
| align=center| 1
| align=center| 1:28
| Bayonne, New Jersey, United States
|

See also
 List of Bellator MMA alumni
 List of Strikeforce alumni

References

External links
Official site

 

1976 births
African-American mixed martial artists
American male mixed martial artists
American male sport wrestlers
Hofstra University alumni
Living people
Mixed martial artists from New York (state)
Nassau Community College alumni
People from Freeport, New York
Sportspeople from Nassau County, New York
Welterweight mixed martial artists
Mixed martial artists utilizing collegiate wrestling
American adoptees
Ultimate Fighting Championship male fighters
21st-century African-American sportspeople
20th-century African-American sportspeople